Vidaluz Meneses Robleto (28 May 1944 – 27 July 2016) was a Nicaraguan librarian, poet, dean, and social activist.

Biography
Vidaluz Meneses Robleto was the daughter of Vida Robleto Valle and General Edmundo Meneses Cantarero. She attended the Colegio La Asunción for  studies, and joined the Sandinista National Liberation Front in 1977. She held a bachelor's degree in humanities with a minor in library science from Central American University, and became a dean of its Faculty of Arts and Letters. She was co-founder of the Nicaraguan Association of Writers (ANIDE) and its first president. She also chaired its board at various times, the last from 2007 to 2009. She was director of the Nicaraguan chapter of PEN International.

In 2013 she won the International Latino Book Award for her bilingual poetry book Flame in the Air (Llama guardada), and in 2014 she received the Order of Chevalier of the Legion of Honor of France for her contribution to arts and letters. Her work, which was translated into six languages, also includes Llama en el Aire – Antología poética 1974 al 1990 (1991), Literatura para niños en Nicaragua (1995), the poetry book Todo es igual y distinto (2004), and the anthologies Sonreír cuando los ojos están serios and La lucha es el más alto de los cantos, both in 2006.

Vidaluz Meneses Robleto died on 27 July 2016 at the age of 72.

Books
1974 – Llama guardada
1982 – El Aire que me llama
1991 – Llama en el Aire – Antología poética 1974 al 1990
1995 – Literatura para niños en Nicaragua
2005 – Todo es igual y distinto
2006 – Sonreír cuando los ojos están serios
2006 – La lucha es el más alto de los cantos
2013 – Flame in the Air (Llama guardada)

Awards
 2013 – International Latino Book Award
 2014 – Chevalier of the Legion of Honor

References

1944 births
2016 deaths
20th-century Nicaraguan poets
21st-century Nicaraguan poets
Chevaliers of the Légion d'honneur
Hispanic and Latino American librarians
Nicaraguan activists
Nicaraguan women activists
Nicaraguan women poets
People from Managua
American women librarians
American librarians
20th-century Nicaraguan women writers
21st-century Nicaraguan women writers
Central American University (Managua) alumni
21st-century American women